Truck Stop may refer to:

Truck stop, or transport cafe in the UK, a commercial facility predicated on providing fuel, parking, and often food and other services to motorists and truck drivers.
Truck Stop, a 2009 album by Swedish band Lasse Stefanz
Truck Stop Women, a 1974 film
 Truck Stop, a German country band